Kevin or Kévin Diaz is the name of:

Kévin Diaz (footballer, born 1983), former French footballer 
Kévin Diaz (footballer, born 1988) French footballer currently playing in France for Istres